Peerson is a surname. Notable people with the surname include:

Cleng Peerson (1783–1865), Norwegian-American pioneer
Jack Peerson (1910–1966), American baseball player
Martin Peerson (1570s–1650s), English musician and composer

See also
Pearson (surname)